Silifke Bridge is a historical bridge in Mersin Province, Turkey.

Geography

It is at the center of Silifke connecting south and north quarters of the city. (Before construction of the ring road, it was also on Turkish state highway  which connects Mersin to Antalya.)

History

The bridge was built by the governor of Silifke L.Octavius Memor on behalf of the Roman emperor Vespasian and his sons Titus and Domitianus (who were the next emperors) in AD 77 and 78. The bridge was used by Silifke citizens for about 18 centuries.  But by the 19th century it fell into ruins. In 1870, it was restored by Mehmet Ali Pasha, the Ottoman  governor of Silifke.  The next restoration was in 1972 by the General Directorate of Highways of Turkey

Details

The building material is limestone. (But only three arches of the original construction survive, others are Ottoman arches)

References

Silifke District
Buildings and structures in Mersin Province
Roman bridges in Turkey
Bridges completed in the 1st century
70s establishments in the Roman Empire
Arch bridges in Turkey
70s establishments
19th-century disestablishments in the Ottoman Empire
1870 establishments in the Ottoman Empire